The 2021 NCAA Division I baseball season play of college baseball in the United States organized by the National Collegiate Athletic Association (NCAA) at the Division I level, began on February 19, 2021. The season progressed through the regular season, many conference tournaments and championship series, and concluded with the 2021 NCAA Division I baseball tournament and 2021 College World Series. The College World Series, consisting of the eight remaining teams in the NCAA tournament and held annually in Omaha, Nebraska, at TD Ameritrade Park Omaha, ended on June 30, 2021. The Mississippi State Bulldogs won the tournament, and were consequently named national champions.

Due to the ongoing COVID-19 pandemic, the start of the season was delayed one week, and some teams opted out of playing at all for the 2021 season. The Ivy League announced on February 18 that no conference competitions would take place, to include conference championships.

Realignment

For 2021 season 
 Four schools began transitions from NCAA Division II to Division I on July 1, 2020.
 Bellarmine, already a D-I member in men's lacrosse, joined D-I for all other sports as a new member of the ASUN Conference.
 Dixie State and Tarleton State joined the Western Athletic Conference (WAC).
 UC San Diego, already a de facto D-I member in men's volleyball and women's water polo (which do not have D-II championship events) as an associate member of the Big West Conference, moved the rest of its athletic program to the Big West.
 Boise State dropped baseball when the season was canceled after the COVID-19 pandemic was declared leading to baseball's second elimination because the athletic department's budget was reduced by $3 million.
 Chicago State dropped baseball in June 2020, effective immediately.
 Furman announced in May 2020 that the Paladins baseball team would be terminated due to budget concerns during the COVID-19 pandemic.
 La Salle and North Carolina Central dropped baseball after this season.
 NJIT moved from the ASUN to the America East Conference.
 Cal State Bakersfield moved from the WAC to the Big West.

Future moves 
The following schools changed conferences effective with the 2022 season:
 Five schools left the Southland Conference. Abilene Christian, Lamar, Sam Houston, and Stephen F. Austin joined the WAC, and Central Arkansas joined the ASUN.
 The Mid-Eastern Athletic Conference lost three members. Bethune–Cookman and Florida A&M joined the Southwestern Athletic Conference, and North Carolina A&T joined the Big South Conference.
 The Ohio Valley Conference lost Eastern Kentucky and Jacksonville State to the ASUN.
 Northern Colorado, a WAC baseball associate through the 2021 season, left for single-sport membership in the Summit League.
 St. Thomas, formerly of NCAA Division III's Minnesota Intercollegiate Athletic Conference, also joined the Summit League after successfully obtaining an NCAA waiver for a direct transition to D-I.

Ballpark changes
 The 2021 season was the first for UConn at Elliot Ballpark, replacing J. O. Christian Field.
 Oklahoma State began play in O'Brate Stadium, replacing Allie P. Reynolds Stadium.
 Florida began play in Florida Ballpark, replacing Alfred A. McKethan Stadium.
 Omaha began play in Tal Anderson Field, replacing J. J. Isaacson Field at Seymour Smith Park.

Season outlook

Conference standings

Conference winners and tournaments
Of the 32 Division I all-sports athletic conferences, 31 sponsor baseball, with the Big Sky Conference the only exception. All but one of these conferences played in the 2021 season; the Ivy League opted out of the season due to COVID-19 concerns. Several conferences canceled or modified their conference tournaments for 2021, with the Big Ten, Mid-American, Mountain West and West Coast joining the Big West and Pac-12 in forgoing a tournament to end the regular season. For those conferences holding a tournament, the teams in each conference that won their regular season title were given the top seeds in each tournament. The winners of these tournaments received automatic invitations to the 2021 NCAA Division I baseball tournament. Conferences that do not hold a tournament award their automatic bids to the regular-season champion.

Coaching changes
This table lists programs that changed head coaches at any point from the first day of the 2021 season until the day before the first day of the 2022 season.

References